Laccophilus flexuosus, is a species of predaceous diving beetle found in India, Bangladesh, Myanmar, Nepal, Pakistan, Sri Lanka, Cambodia, China, Hong Kong, Indonesia, Iran, Iraq, Japan, Taiwan, Cambodia, Laos and Vietnam.

Description
This elongated oval species has a body length of 4.3 mm.

References 

Dytiscidae
Insects of Sri Lanka
Insects described in 1838